The 2018 Southern Utah Thunderbirds football team represented Southern Utah University in the 2018 NCAA Division I FCS football season. They were led by third-year head coach Demario Warren and played their home games at Eccles Coliseum in Cedar City, Utah as seventh-year as members of the Big Sky Conference. They finished the season 1–10, 1–7 in Big Sky play to finish in 12th place.

Previous season 
The Thunderbirds finished the 2016 season 9–3, 7–1 in Big Sky play to earn a share of the conference championship with Weber State. They received the conference's automatic bid to the FCS Playoffs where they lost to Weber State in the second round.

Preseason

Polls
On July 16, 2018 during the Big Sky Kickoff in Spokane, Washington, the Thunderbirds were predicted to finish in sixth place in both the coaches and media poll.

Preseason All-Conference Team
The Thunderbirds had five players selected to the Preseason All-Conference Team.

Marquez Tucker – Sr. OT

PJ Nu’usa – Jr. OG

Zach Larsen – Jr. C

Chinedu Ahanonu – Sr. LB

Jalen Russell – So. CB

Schedule

 Source: Schedule

Game summaries

North Alabama

at Oregon State

at Arizona

at Northern Arizona

at Eastern Washington

Sacramento State

at Idaho

Northern Colorado

Montana

Weber State

at Cal Poly

References

Southern Utah
Southern Utah Thunderbirds football seasons
Southern Utah Thunderbirds football